Bowyer is an English surname, taken from the traditional craftsman name bowyer, a maker of bows.  Click here to hear how to pronounce the name. Notable people with the surname include:

 Adrian Bowyer (born 1952), British engineer and mathematician
 Ashley Bowyer (born 1988), American soccer player
 Bernadette Bowyer (born 1966), Canadian field hockey player 
 Bertram Bowyer, 2nd Baron Denham (1927–2021), British politician
 Brendan Bowyer (1938-2020), Irish singer
 Chaz Bowyer (1926-2008), British author
 Clint Bowyer (born 1979), American racing driver
 Charles Stuart Bowyer (1934-2020), astronomer
 Dean Bowyer college baseball coach
 Edmund Bowyer several people
 Eric Bowyer Northern Irish football player
 Frank Bowyer (1922-1999), English footballer
 Gary Bowyer (born 1971), English footballer
 George Bowyer several people
 Goof Bowyer (1903-1998) American football and basketball coach
 Glen Bowyer (born 1979) Australian football player 
 Henry Bowyer (1786-1853), British politician
 Ian Bowyer (born 1951), English footballer
 Jerry Bowyer (born 1962), American investment manager, author, and columnist
 John Bowyer several people
 Kevin Bowyer (born 1961), English organist
 Lee Bowyer (born 1977), English footballer
 Michael Bowyer (1599–1645), actor in English Renaissance theatre
 Matthew Bowyer (born 1973), English cricket player
 Percy Bowyer (1909-1998), Australian rules footballer
 Robert Bowyer several people
 Ruth Bowyer (c.1761-1788)), convict sent to Australia on the First Fleet
 Richard Bowyer several people
 Sam Bowyer (1887 - c.1961), English football player
 Theresa Bowyer journalist 
 Thomas Bowyer several people
 Travis Bowyer (born 1981), American baseball player
 Walt Bowyer (born 1960), American football player
 William Bowyer several people

English-language surnames
Occupational surnames
English-language occupational surnames